Toralv Kollin Markussen (23 February 1895 – 17 December 1973) was a Norwegian politician for the Communist Party.

Biography 
Toralv Kollin Markussen was born in Ankenes on 23 February 1895. He held various positions in Narvik city council during the terms 1931–1934 and 1933–1937.

Markussen joined the central committee of the Norwegian Communist Party in 1936. In 1945 he was elected to the Norwegian Parliament as Representative 4 of the Market towns of Nordland, Troms and Finnmark. He  was not re-elected in 1949. He died on 17 December 1973.

References

1895 births
1973 deaths
Norwegian communists
Members of the Storting
Communist Party of Norway politicians
20th-century Norwegian politicians